Prekaz i Epërm is a village in Skenderaj municipality, Kosovo.

Notes

References 

Villages in Skenderaj